The Swedish Dynamic Sports Shooting Association (SDSF), is the Swedish association for practical shooting under the International Practical Shooting Confederation.

See also 
Swedish Handgun Championship
Swedish Rifle Championship
Swedish Shotgun Championship

References

External links 
 Official homepage of Svenska Dynamiska Sportskytteförbundet

Regions of the International Practical Shooting Confederation
Practical Shooting